Beloyarsky District is the name of several administrative and municipal districts in Russia.
Beloyarsky District, Khanty-Mansi Autonomous Okrug, an administrative and municipal district of Khanty–Mansi Autonomous Okrug – Yugra
Beloyarsky District, Sverdlovsk Oblast, an administrative district of Sverdlovsk Oblast

See also
Beloyarsky (disambiguation)

References